Euplectella is a genus of glass sponges which includes the well-known Venus' Flower Basket. Glass sponges have a skeleton made up of silica spicules that can form geometric patterns. These animals are most commonly found on muddy sea bottoms in the Western Pacific and Indian Oceans. They are sessile organisms and do not move once attached to a rock. They can be found at depths between 100 m and 1000 m but are most commonly found at depths greater than 500 m.

Anatomy 
The body shape of Euplectella is cylindrical and vase-like with a hole located at the top of the cylinder structure. This tubular shape is referred to as asconoid. The inner structure of this animal is covered by a layer of choanocytes. Euplectella is a member of the class Sclerospongiae or glass sponges. These sponges are anchored to the seafloor by thousands of spicules. Spicules are long glassy fibers that are covered with recurved barbs. Spicules provide high beam strength support for anchoring and strengthening the structure of this animal. The skeleton of this animal is made of silica that is arranged in cylindrical lattice patterns. These patterns enable flexibility and resilience to damage.

This species often has a symbiotic relationship with shrimp. One male and one female shrimp-like Stenopodidea breed and live inside the Venus Flower Basket, a member of the genus Euplectella. Stenopodidea offspring leave through holes in the sponge. Eventually if Stenopodidea become too large, they become trapped in the basket for the remainder of their lifetime. The pair of Stenopodidea that live inside Euplectella, clean it while the waste produced by Euplectella serves as food for the Stenopodidea.

Reproduction 
There is very little known about the reproduction of this species. It can reproduce sexually and asexually. Sea sponges have hermaphroditic properties. When conditions are unfavorable, sea sponges resort to asexual reproduction. This occurs through the presence of an ameobocyte on a deteriorating sponge. Once the deteriorating sponge is gone, the clump of cells remaining begins to grow a new sponge. In sexual sea sponge reproduction, gametes are released into the water by male sponges and are absorbed through the inhalant current of the female sponge. Fertilization occurs when the sperm reaches the ovum. The zygote experiences radial holoblastic cleavage and eventually forms free flowing larvae which develop into new sponge.

Diet 
Euplectella are filter feeders. Water is drawn into its central cavity through holes in the sides of the sponge. Organic debris and microscopic organisms are absorbed through this process. They consume bacteria and small plankton.

Life Stages 
Euplectella experiences two main life stages: the larval stage or the adult stage. In the larval stage, the larvae is free flowing in the water. This type of larvae is considered trichimella due to its free swimming nature. Eventually, the larvae attached to rocks and metamorphoses into sea sponge. In the adult stage, Euplectella are sessile and attached firmly to rocks through spicules. It is unclear how long Euplectella generally live however other genus of glass sponge have been known to live up to 15,000 years in the wild. Although the intricate skeleton of Euplectella provides some protection from predation, starfish are known to eat them.

Species
Euplectella aspera
Euplectella aspergillum
Euplectella crassistellata
Euplectella cucumer
Euplectella curvistellata
Euplectella gibbsa
Euplectella imperialis
Euplectella jovis
Euplectella marshalli
Euplectella nobilis
Euplectella nodosa
Euplectella oweni
Euplectella paratetractina
Euplectella plumosum
Euplectella simplex
Euplectella suberea
Euplectella timorensis

References

Further reading
 

Hexactinellida genera